Hydra (often capitalized as HYDRA) is a fictional terrorist organization appearing in American comic books published by Marvel Comics. Its name alludes to the mythical Lernaean Hydra, as does its motto: "If a head is cut off, two more shall take its place," proclaiming the group's resilience and growing strength in the face of resistance. Originally a Nazi organization led by the Red Skull during World War II, Hydra is taken over and turned into a neo-Nazi international crime syndicate by Baron Wolfgang von Strucker. Hydra agents often wear distinctive green garb featuring a serpent motif. Hydra's plans for world domination are regularly foiled by Marvel Universe superheroes and the intelligence organization S.H.I.E.L.D.

Hydra has appeared in various media adaptations, including films, television series, and video games. It plays a major role in the Marvel Cinematic Universe.

Publication history

Hydra first appeared in Strange Tales #135 (August 1965). In its original continuity, it was headed by nondescript businessman Arnold Brown, who was killed when S.H.I.E.L.D. apparently crushed the organization. Hydra soon returned, however, headed by Baron Wolfgang von Strucker, with the support of the Nazi Red Skull; Hydra's changing origin is one of Marvel's earliest retcons. After its initial defeat, several of its branches, such as its scientific branch A.I.M. (Advanced Idea Mechanics) and the Secret Empire, became independent.

Crypt of Shadows #5, published in 1973, reprinted a story from Menace #10 (1954), but with a change to a line of dialogue that erroneously implied that Hydra is premier mentioned is in a 1954 issue.  In the reprint, an agent of an unspecified enemy government is changed to identify himself as working for Hydra when he paid off a scientist named Dr. Nostrum for information about a cobalt bomb that turned people into monsters.  Dr. Nostrum shot all the other scientists on his team after they were turned into monsters, then shot himself after his son put an image from a monster magazine on his mirror.

Organization

Before the evolution of mankind, a cabal of immortal hooded reptoids came to Earth, planning to start a legacy of evil. Millions of years later, they corrupted an Asian secret society of geniuses known as the Brotherhood of the Spear, which resulted in that group being called "the Beast" by the Brotherhood of the Shield.  The corrupted Brotherhood of the Spear spread out, ingraining itself like a multi-headed serpent into all facets of human society, from science to magic to politics. As time wore on, the organization's name changed and it included the Cathari sect, as well as the Thule Society. The Nazi sub-group, funded by the Thule Society, is brought into the main Hydra fold after the end of World War II.

One of the Nazi members, Baron Wolfgang von Strucker, quickly seized control of the Hydra organization and restructured it to be dedicated to world domination through terrorist and subversive activities on various fronts, resulting in a global neo-fascist New World Order. To this end, Baron von Strucker used his personal fortune, based on his recovered hoard of Nazi plunder from World War II, and funds established by the original leaders of the Japanese secret society that became part of the old Hydra. However, after von Strucker's first death, Hydra broke into factions (such as A.I.M., the Secret Empire, THEM, etc.) that each adopted its own reorganized modus operandi. Eventually, this fragmentation would lead to a Hydra civil war, even after von Strucker's resurrection.

According to the files discovered by Nick Fury, Hydra is split into four independent sectors: 
International Corporations (Fronts created using a legitimate business to conceal illicit activities)
 Government Assets (Individuals within a national government's chain of command. Long-term resources that benefit from the minimal turnover inherent in bureaucracies)
 Global Criminal Groups (Subsidiary organizations created for short-term goals. Also used to deflect unwanted interest from the global law enforcement community)
Intelligence Gathering (S.H.I.E.L.D. and all their underlying resources) Hydra regards S.H.I.E.L.D. as their "most valuable proactive intelligence asset" while its government assets include the U.S. Department of the Treasury, the FBI, and the NSA, as well as the Canadian Security Intelligence Service and the GRU and SVR of Russia.

Nick Fury has theorized that his previous successes against Hydra were either feints to make him believe that he is making headway against the group or manipulation by Hydra to eliminate any possible competition or possible rogue sub-organizations.

In the aftermath of the Secret Invasion and Baron von Strucker's second death, there followed a series of power struggles, which eventually left Hydra without a formal leader. The splintering of Hydra accelerated, with various cells operating seemingly independently. Eventually, the Red Skull, returning to his Nazi beliefs, started building a new Hydra from the ground up. However, this brought him into conflict with Baron Zemo, who is attempting to control what remains of the old Hydra.

The Red Skull convinced his now-aware Cosmic Cube, Kobik, to cooperate with S.H.I.E.L.D. in creating Pleasant Hill and discovered that Kobik could alter people's memories to make them believe they had been members of the Hydra of which the Red Skull had told them stories.  However, the Red Skull failed to realize that the Hydra he is building and the Hydra Kobik had created false memories of were two different things, with the now-Hydra Captain America disobeying the Red Skull and planning something else.

Technology
As advanced as any on Earth, Hydra's technology is based in part on artifacts of the alien Gnobians discovered by Baron von Strucker in 1944. Hydra uses advanced experimental vehicles and devices along with conventional military vehicles, seacraft, aircraft, pistols and standard concussive force blasters, and communications equipment.

Hydra personnel are issued cowled jumpsuits, which have included a number of designs over the years. Originally, the jumpsuits were green with a yellow H design, and later incorporated a red and brown color scheme, but in time were changed back to green with a serpent motif.

Fictional organization history

Founding 
Hydra's history as depicted in Marvel Universe continuity is a long, tumultuous and convoluted one, spanning millennia, and going back to the Third Dynasty of Egypt, with all references to the ancient group disappearing around the Renaissance.

The modern incarnation of Hydra originates when the Nazi spymaster known as the Red Skull took control of an Asian secret society, the Brotherhood of the Spear, merging it with a German occult organization, the Thule Society.

Some time before 1943, the Red Skull started creating a Hydra cell in Japan, merging several underground Japanese secret societies, including a faction of the Hand, with several fugitive members of Nazi Germany and Imperial Japan, to become the modern Hydra. This incarnation of Hydra operated in Japan, directed by a Japanese militarist called the Supreme Hydra, and in Germany, under the control of the Red Skull and Arnim Zola. However, after joining Hydra, Baron Wolfgang von Strucker seized control of the organization and constructed the Hydra base Tsunami - called Hydra Island.  The original Hydra Island is invaded by the Leatherneck Raiders and the Japanese Samurai Squad, and the base is destroyed. Strucker then slowly steered the organization towards the goal of world domination. That campaign brought him into conflict with Charles Xavier and the future Magneto, among others.

Conflict with S.H.I.E.L.D. 
Once Hydra became more brazenly public in its operations, this led to the creation of the original agency known as S.H.I.E.L.D., specifically to counter Hydra's threat to world security. After Hydra apparently assassinated S.H.I.E.L.D.'s first executive director, Col. Rick Stoner, Nick Fury is appointed as executive director. Hydra agents attempted to assassinate Nick Fury before his appointment as S.H.I.E.L.D.'s director, but failed.

After several failed Hydra campaigns, including the failure of the world blackmail attempt using the Betatron Bomb, the creation of the Overkill Horn (designed to detonate all nuclear explosives worldwide), and the bio-engineered "Death-Spore" Bomb, which led directly to Strucker's first death at the hands of Fury, and several deceived Hydra operatives.

In the wake of Strucker's first death, the surviving elements of Hydra broke into factions that each adopted its own reorganized modus operandi. Several of these factions developed "super-agents" that would occasionally break away in turn to become freelance operatives, or, in some rarer cases, superheroes, such as the original Spider-Woman. During this era, Hydra's collective threat is mitigated by not only occasionally infighting among themselves, but their operating policy of punishing failure with death, often led to their killing of each other more often than their intended victims. Hydra frequently found itself defeated by S.H.I.E.L.D., various superheroes, and even apparently unpowered civilians, like the motorcycle racing team, Team America.

Strucker's resurrection 
Strucker is revived, and he reunites several of the Hydra factions under his leadership, renewing his campaign against S.H.I.E.L.D. and humanity for several more years. Despite his reorganization of the group, various independent Hydra factions continued to operate around the Marvel Universe, and a Hydra civil war would later result. While Baron Helmut Zemo had Strucker placed in stasis for his own ends, the Gorgon and Strucker's second wife, Elsbeth von Strucker, mystically created a clone of Strucker, whom they set up to fail, allowing for a public execution of him, after which, as part of an alliance with the Hand, they utilized an army of brainwashed superheroes and supervillains, including Northstar and Elektra, to launch a massive assault on S.H.I.E.L.D. The assault is repelled, and Wolverine went on to kill the Gorgon.

Hydra later planned an all-out attack on the United States by smuggling missiles into New York for use in a planned bio-weapon assault on the Ogallala Aquifer. They formed a distraction through using a team that had the duplicated powers of several Avengers, (Iron Man and Captain America, and former Avengers Thor and Hawkeye), but were inevitably foiled by Spider-Man and the other New Avengers.

Civil War 
Spider-Woman (Jessica Drew) is captured by S.H.I.E.L.D. during the events of Civil War, Hydra stormed the S.H.I.E.L.D. Helicarrier and frees her. Spider-Woman, a S.H.I.E.L.D. agent and member of the Avengers, had been working undercover for Hydra under the orders of Nick Fury, now deposed as Director of S.H.I.E.L.D. following the events of Secret War, to whom she is still loyal. Hydra revealed that they knew of her betrayal, and wanted her to replace the Viper as their current leader, as she is unstable. Spider-Woman refused their offer, destroying in an explosion the Hydra base to which she had been taken.

As Spider-Woman revealed her true identity as Queen Veranke of the Skrull Empire, Hydra is left with a void in its control organization, filled by Congressman Woodman. Under his rule, the young Hardball, empowered by the Power Broker, is appointed as a double agent, acting both as an Initiative recruit and as a Hydra spy, with the role of gathering information about the Initiative and doing errands for Hydra in exchange for secrecy and the expensive health care needed by his brother, a former UCWF wrestler, who is crippled in the ring.

Hardball, however, deeply hurt and shamed by the compromises Woodman forced him to endure and Komodo's attempt to bail him out of Hydra by telling his secrets to his field leader Gravity, mercilessly killed Congressman Woodman in front of his subordinates. His ersatz coup d'état paid off, and Hardball is appointed as the new Supreme Leader of the organization, severing every tie with his former life. His joining Hydra, however, is revealed to be caused simply by his having nowhere else to go. He surrendered to the Shadow Initiative, and is sent to the Negative Zone prison, destroying his Hydra cell.

Secret Invasion 
After the events of "Secret Invasion", Nick Fury discovered that S.H.I.E.L.D. is under the control of Hydra, and apparently had been from the beginning. He also discovered a number of organizations under Hydra's alleged control, including the United States' FBI Science and Technology Branch, the NSA, and the U.S. Department of the Treasury, along with the Russian Main Intelligence Directorate and Foreign Intelligence Service, and the Canadian Security Intelligence Service.

Meanwhile, after having destroyed Hydra's undersea headquarters, Ichor, due to its having been infiltrated by the Skrull invasion force, Strucker rebuilt Hydra from the ground up, and after his discovery that Fury had learned the truth, reconvened the other main heads of Hydra: the Viper, Madame Hydra, Kraken, and the Hive, as well as resurrecting the Gorgon for the purpose of showing Hydra's "true self" to the world.

Hydra (alongside A.I.M.) later appeared in an alliance with H.A.M.M.E.R. Following the defeat of Norman Osborn, H.A.M.M.E.R. disbands, with Madame Hydra using the remaining members to reinforce Hydra.

After the existence of Pleasant Hill, a top-secret community where Maria Hill incarcerated various supervillains (after brainwashing them to believe they were regular civilians via a sentient Cosmic Cube named Kobik), is exposed and subsequently shut down, the Red Skull's clone used the subsequent backlash in the intelligence community to assemble a new version of Hydra, starting with Sin and Crossbones. Although his efforts were still focused on rebuilding the organization, he had already scored a significant victory, after the sentient Cosmic Cube, having been "raised" by the Red Skull in the form of a young girl, to see Hydra as a great organization, altered Steve Rogers' memories so that he believed he had been a Hydra sleeper agent since childhood.

Secret Empire 
"Secret Empire" is about Hydra's goal, as the mind-altered Steve Rogers uses the Planetary Defense Shield, to entrap the Chitauri opposition, stranding them beyond the Shield. Baron Zemo would use the Darkhold to enhance Blackout's powers to entrap all of Manhattan within the Darkforce, following the fight between the superheroes there and Baron Zemo's Army of Evil. Having taken political and military control of the United States, Hydra proceeds to round up and incarcerate all Inhumans, and all mutants are condemned to the western California territory of New Tian. Becoming the Hydra Supreme, Captain America forms Hydra's version of the Avengers, consisting of the Scarlet Witch who is possessed by Chthon, the Vision who is suffering from an A.I. Virus created by Arnim Zola, Odinson, the Taskmaster, Deadpool, Eric O'Grady's Life Model Decoy counterpart the Black Ant, and Doctor Octopus' form of the Superior Octopus. Throughout this period, Hydra encountered resistance from the Underground.

Sam Wilson, the original Falcon, and currently the All-New Captain America, brought hope to the resistance with a plan to bring their real Captain America back by using the remaining Cosmic Cube, under Scott Lang and the Winter Soldier's hand on the Hydra Supreme's Cosmic Cube-infused Hydra suit. As Hydra began to fall, most of Hydra's Avengers members, Odinson, the Taskmaster, and the Black Ant, began to betray Hydra, joining the resistance, while the Vision and the Scarlet Witch were freed from the villains' control.

Deadpool came to regret his betrayal of his friends, having killed Phil Coulson and Emily Preston and having lied to Emily's family, with Maria Hill having given him a painful lesson. Kobik returned the real Captain America with his memories intact, and with the Hydra Supreme defeated, Hydra's reign over the United States came to an end, with major casualties being Rick Jones, Phil Coulson, and the Black Widow, who had been killed. The Hydra Supreme is imprisoned in the Shadow Pillar as he is visited by Captain America to bring up the fact that he will stand trial for his crimes. After leaving, the Hydra Supreme is chained up as one of the guards whispered "Hail Hydra" into his ear.

Due to the Hydra Supreme's imprisonment, Baron Zemo had to keep Hydra active. He planned to spring the Hydra Supreme from the Shadow Pillar, only to meet opposition from the Punisher in the War Machine Armor. After the attempted jailbreak is thwarted, the Hydra Supreme is apprehended, while Baron Zemo got away.

Spider-Geddon 
During the "Spider-Geddon" storyline, Arnim Zola led a bio-duplicate of the Gorgon and some Hydra agents to the Superior Octopus' lair, where Arnim Zola tried to get the Superior Octopus to help rebuild Hydra. The Superior Octopus turned him down, stating that he had upheld his bargain to Hydra, as Arnim Zola claimed that one does not leave Hydra until their death. After defeating the Hydra Agents, the bio-duplicate of the Gorgon, and Arnim Zola, the Superior Octopus had Arnim Zola spread the word to Hydra to never come after him again.

Iron Man 2020 
During the "Iron Man 2020" event, Pepper Potts infiltrates Hydra Base Omicron to look for Tony Stark's biological father Jude and get a DNA sample from him. She also meets a rookie Hydra agent named Robbie Fleckman. After a ride in the elevator, she follows a Hydra agent into a meeting with Dr. M. As Pepper gets a glimpse of Jude, Dr. M. unveils his Hydra-Bot. To demonstrate the Hydra-Bots abilities, Dr. M volunteers Robbie for the demonstration. Before he can demonstrate the cutting off of a part of Robbie's ear and the cauterizing, the Hydra-Bot goes berserk and cuts off half of Dr. M's left arm claiming that it has no need for a master. Pepper changes into Rescue as she reprimands Hydra for building a robot during the A.I. Army's activities. After rescuing Robbie, Rescue fights her way past smaller Hydra-Bots and has H.A.P.P.Y. scan the building for Jude. As Rescue confronts Jude and tries to explain why she's here, Robbie runs in stating that Hydra Base Omicron is locking down. When the Hydra-Bot attacks and grabs Jude, Robbie tries to save him by throwing a pocketknife only for a tiny part of Jude's right pinkie to accidentally get cut off. Rescue passes herself as a fellow robot to confuse the Hydra-Bot. As the Hydra-Bot starts to self-destruct, Rescue advises Robbie and Jude to flee as she claims the pinkie fragment. Upon fleeing the exploding Hydra base, Rescue contacts Bethany telling her that she's got Jude's DNA sample and to prep the lab for her arrival.

Membership

Other versions

Amalgam Comics
An alternate version of Hydra has appeared in Amalgam Comics. They are very similar to the mainstream version of Hydra and wear the same green and yellow outfits, but with black eyes instead of red. They first appear in Super-Soldier #1 (April 1996) and are led by the Green Skull, alias Lex Luthor (a cross between Luthor and the Red Skull).

Exiles
Another alternate version of Hydra appears throughout Exiles #91-94, where they are well underway with their plan to take over the world. This version is being led by Madame Hydra (Sue Storm, the Invisible Woman in the regular Marvel universe) and her lover, Wolverine. Various other superhumans, including Captain Hydra and Slaymaster, are agents of Hydra in this world.

Secret Wars (2015)
During the Secret Wars storyline, there were different versions of Hydra that resided on Battleworld:

 One version of Hydra ruled the Battleworld domain of the Hydra Empire, which was based on the remnants of Earth-85826. The members of this Hydra consisted of Arnim Zola, Grant Ward, Dum Dum Dugan, Nick Fury Jr., and the Toad. In addition to female assassins possessed by Hydra's version of the symbiotes called Vipers, Hydra also had its own version of the Avengers, consisting of Captain Hydra (Leopold Zola), Chancellor Cassandra, Doctor Mindbubble, the Iron Baron (Baron Strucker), Lord Drain, and Venom.
 Another version of Hydra resided in the Battleworld domain called the Walled City of New York, which is based on the remnants of Earth-21722. The members of this Hydra were Arnim Zola, Baron Strucker, Baron Heinrich Zemo, Hank Johnson, MODOK, the Red Skull, and the Viper. Hydra controlled one section of the Walled City of New York in opposition to S.H.I.E.L.D.'s section.

Ultimate Marvel
The Ultimate Marvel version of Hydra appears as an "anti-government" organization (though their political philosophy is left deliberately vague). Following the events of the Ultimatum storyline. J. Jonah Jameson recalled the time when the original Spider-Man stopped from an attack by Hydra led by the Viper. Modi (Thor's son) is later seen in allegiance and acquiring weapons from Project Pegasus, including Modi using the Mind Gem on Director Flumm (to attempt to kill the U.S. President), and Giant-Woman attacking the second Spider-Man (until stopped by his "venom-strike"). They are defeated by both S.H.I.E.L.D. and the Ultimates, although some members escaped. Hydra's collateral damage resulted in the deaths of Jake Miller's family. The Death's Head Camp is led by the Commander Crimson to which Nick Fury masqueraded as Scorpio and infiltrated Hydra and came across Hydra soldier Abigail Brand. After the demises of Commander Crimson and the Death's Head Camp, S.H.I.E.L.D. Director Monica Chang grants allows the Howling Commandos to stop Hydra's remnants.

In other media

Television
 Hydra appears in The Incredible Hulk episode "Enter: She-Hulk". 
 Hydra appears in the X-Men: Evolution episodes "X-23" and "Target X". This version of the organization created X-23 from Wolverine's DNA, with Viper as the Supreme Hydra while Omega Red and Gauntlet are mercenaries aligned with Hydra.
 Hydra appears in The Avengers: Earth's Mightiest Heroes. First appearing in the episode "Meet Captain America", this version of the organization is a branch of Nazi Germany under Baron Heinrich Zemo, with the Red Skull as the group's super soldier and Baron Strucker working under him. In the present, Strucker took over as leader, with the Grim Reaper and Viper serving under him while Baron Zemo and Arnim Zola have distanced themselves from Hydra.
 Hydra appears in Avengers Assemble, with Hydra agents voiced by Roger Craig Smith and other voice actors. Notable members include the Red Skull, Baron Strucker, Crossbones, the Crimson Widow and Arnim Zola. Additionally, Hydra provided backing to the Cabal and the U-Foes.
 Hydra appears in Ultimate Spider-Man, with known members including Arnim Zola, Crossbones, Baron Mordo, and Dr. Michael Morbius. In the fourth season, Hydra backs Doctor Octopus's formation of a new iteration of the Sinister Six. They also create the Carnage symbiote and the Spider-Slayers.
 Hydra appears in Marvel Future Avengers, with the Red Skull as a known member. This version of the organization works in collaboration with Kang the Conqueror's Masters of Evil and have kidnapped and genetically manipulated several children to turn them into loyal super-soldiers who believe the Avengers are villains. Three of the children, Makoto, Adi, and Chloe discover the truth and defect to the Avengers while a fourth named Bruno is recruited by the Masters of Evil.
 Hydra appears in the Spider-Man episode "Spider-Island" Pt. 2, with known members including Arnim Zola and Crossbones.

Film
 Hydra appears in the television film Nick Fury: Agent of S.H.I.E.L.D.. This version of the group's agents wear Men in Black-type suits rather than the comics' green uniforms.
 Hydra agents appear in the prologue for the animated film Ultimate Avengers 2, fighting against Captain America and Black Widow.
 Hydra appears in Heroes United: Iron Man and Hulk. Hydra scientists Dr. Cruler and Dr. Fump hire the Abomination to capture the Hulk for an experiment before turning on the former to use him in the same experiment.
 Hydra appears in Heroes United: Iron Man & Captain America.

Marvel Cinematic Universe 
Several Hydra cells appear in media set in the Marvel Cinematic Universe:
 The organization first appears in the live-action film Captain America: The First Avenger (2011). Under the Red Skull's leadership, they originally started as the Third Reich's advanced science branch, utilizing several experimental aircraft such as the Focke-Wulf Triebflügel VTOL aircraft and an intercontinental flying-wing bomber based in part on the Horten Ho 229. Additionally, the organization was founded on a belief that humanity could not be trusted with its own freedom and must be subjugated for its own good. Throughout World War II, Captain America dismantles Hydra, leading to its apparent disbanding by the war's end.
 Hydra resurfaces in the live-action film Captain America: The Winter Soldier (2014). Secretly sustained by Arnim Zola and, later his reconstructed personality within S.H.I.E.L.D., the organization bred chaos over the post-WWII era to make humanity submit willingly. Under Alexander Pierce's leadership, they intend to carry out mass assassinations of citizens recognized as a threat to Hydra based on an algorithm devised by Zola. Hydra's S.H.I.E.L.D. element is ultimately destroyed by Captain America, Black Widow, and the Falcon. In the film's mid-credits scene, a branch of Hydra under Baron Strucker secretly uses Loki's scepter to create weapons and superhumans.
 Hydra cells appear in the live-action TV series Agents of S.H.I.E.L.D. The organization first appears in the season one episode "Turn, Turn, Turn" as part of a tie-in with The Winter Soldier. Known members include Dr. List, younger versions of Jasper Sitwell and Strucker, John Garrett (portrayed by Bill Paxton), double-agent Grant Ward (portrayed by Brett Dalton), Daniel Whitehall (portrayed by Reed Diamond), Sunil Bakshi (portrayed by Simon Kassianides), Werner von Strucker (portrayed by Spencer Treat Clark), Gideon Malick (portrayed by Powers Boothe), Gideon's father Wilfred (portrayed by Darren Barnet and Neal Bledsoe), General Hale (portrayed by Catherine Dent), and General Hale's genetically-engineered daughter Ruby (portrayed by Dove Cameron). In the first season, Garrett serves as the mastermind behind "Project Centipede", a subset of the S.H.I.E.L.D. infiltrator faction, before he is betrayed by his bodyguard Deathlok and killed by Phil Coulson in the season one finale "Beginning of the End". Introduced in season two, Whitehall and Bakshi's faction seek to find a lost city associated with an Inhuman Diviner while using Hydra Industries as a front. Introduced in season three, Ward's short-lived faction, which included Werner, attempts to unite Hydra while planning revenge on Coulson's group. Gideon's faction, the original Hydra movement, is a fanatical cult that worships an ancient, powerful Inhuman entity called Hive. Introduced in season five, General Hale's faction wants S.H.I.E.L.D. to unite with them and the alien Confederacy to prepare for Thanos' impending attack. Introduced in season seven, Wilfred starts out as a lowly doorman in the 1930s and is initially unaware of his connection to Hydra until he is tasked with delivering what would become the Red Skull's super-soldier serum to them before going on to become a high-ranking agent of Hydra, and ostensibly S.H.I.E.L.D.
 Hydra appears in the live-action film Avengers: Age of Ultron (2015), when the Avengers raid Strucker's base and successfully retrieve Loki's scepter. In the process, they encounter the twins Pietro and Wanda Maximoff, as well as other alien technology. The genocidal robot Ultron subsequently kills Strucker and recruits the twins to help him destroy the Avengers.
 Hydra appears in the live-action film Ant-Man (2015), in which Darren Cross attempts to sell his Yellowjacket technology to a Hydra group led by Mitchell Carson. Ant-Man is able to defeat the agents, though Carson escapes with a vial of Cross' Pym particles.
 Hydra appears in the live-action film Captain America: Civil War (2016). Hydra official Vasily Karpov (portrayed by Gene Farber) oversaw the Winter Soldier program in the past. In the present, Helmut Zemo raids his home in Cleveland, Ohio and tortures him for information about the program. After getting what he needed, Zemo kills Karpov.
 An alternate timeline version Hydra appears in the live-action film Avengers: Endgame (2019). Captain America travels back in time to the events of The Avengers and encounters S.H.I.E.L.D.'s S.T.R.I.K.E. team as they are transporting Loki's scepter. Recognizing them as Hydra sleeper agents, he feigns allegiance with Hydra to trick them into giving him the scepter.
 Hydra appears in a flashback in the live-action miniseries WandaVision episode "Previously On", in which they observe Wanda coming into contact with Loki's scepter and the Mind Stone.
 An alternate timeline version of the Red Skull's Hydra appears in the Disney+ animated series What If...? episode "What If... Captain Carter Were the First Avenger?"

Video games
 Hydra appears in X-Men: The Official Game. This version of the group is led by Silver Samurai and worked in collaboration with William Stryker to create Master Mold and the Sentinels. Under Silver Samurai's orders, Hydra infiltrates Stryker's base to remove all evidence and Sentinel equipment, but inadvertently activate Master Mold.
 Hydra appears in Spider-Man: Web of Fire.
 A Hydra aerial base appears in the S.H.I.E.L.D. stage of Marvel vs. Capcom 3: Fate of Two Worlds.
 Hydra appears in Captain America: Super Soldier. Their base is Castle Zemo rechristened Castle Hydra, housing the Sleeper and led by Red Skull. Other members are Baron Strucker, Armin Zola, Madame Hydra and Iron Cross.
 Hydra appears in Marvel: Avengers Alliance. Known members include Baron Helmut Zemo, Moonstone, Viper, and the Hydra Four.
 Hydra appears in Avengers Initiative.
 Hydra appears in Marvel Heroes.
 Hydra agents appear in Lego Marvel Super Heroes. Known members include Red Skull, Armin Zola and Hydra Agent.
 Hydra agents appear in Lego Marvel's Avengers. Known members include Baron Strucker, the Red Skull, Dr. List, Viper, Crossbones, and Armin Zola.
 Hydra appears in Lego Marvel Super Heroes 2. Known members include the Red Skull, Baron Helmut Zemo, Arnim Zola, the Hydra Supreme version of Captain America, and the Hydra Four. One section of Kang the Conqueror's Chronopolis is the Hydra Empire, taken from an alternate reality where Hydra won World War II and rules the world.

Live performance
Hydra agents appear in the Marvel Universe: LIVE! stage show.

See also
 SS-Totenkopfverbände – A real-life organization in Nazi Germany responsible for running the concentration camps and death camps. This group also used a skull in its insignia.

References

External links
 Hydra at Marvel.com
 Marvel Directory entry
 Villains of Marvel Comics: Hydra
 Wayback Machine backup

Villains in animated television series
Comics about neo-Nazism
Comic book terrorist organizations
Fictional cults
Fictional elements introduced in 1965
Fictional organizations in Marvel Comics
Fictional organized crime groups
Fictional secret societies
Fictional terrorist organizations
Marvel Comics neo-Nazis